Rasikkum Seemane is a 2010 Indian Tamil-language thriller film written and directed by R. K. Vidhyadaran. Produced by Thirumalai though the Trans India banner, the film stars Srikanth, Navya Nair and Aravind Akash in the lead roles. The music was composed by Vijay Antony with cinematography by M. V. Panneerselvam and editing by Suresh M. Kothi. The film was released on 12 February 2010, after two years of being stalled, to negative reviews.

Plot
The film starts with two 10-year-old boys, Nandhu (Srikanth) and Aravind (Aravind Akash), arguing heatedly about Gayathri (Navya Nair) and who loves her the most. As the young girl herself remarks, they are all only in seventh standard, and claims she will only fall in love with whoever happens to become a doctor. In the meantime, Gayathri's father is transferred elsewhere, while Nandhu's father commits suicide after killing his mother. Nandhu is taken care of his father's closest friend (R. K. Vidyadharan) and as he cannot afford to help the kid become a doctor, he hatches a plan to become a professional blackmailer. A dozen years later, you've got an adult Nandhu who is a student and professional blackmailer, now operating under the aegis of his guru and his associate (Sathyan). Until Gayathri reemerges, but for Nandhu's distraught, she has already met Aravind, who actually has become a doctor. Realisation comes to Nandhu slowly, but when all his plans to stop them falling in love backfire, he decides to take some drastic action, blackmailing her into eloping with him, but it never occurs to him to marry her.

Cast

 Srikanth as Nandhu
 Navya Nair as Gayathri
 Aravind Akash as Aravind
 Sathyan as Nandhu's associate
 Bose Venkat
 Mayilsamy
 Dhamu
 Dhandapani
 Neelima Rani
 Vasu Vikram
 Leema Babu as younger Gayathri
 Vaheeda (item number)

Production
The film materialized and initial reports regarding the lead cast appeared in September 2007, announcing that Srikanth and Navya Nair would be appearing together, with the film, then being titled as Ettapan. The film revealed its cast and crew members and plot in December 2007, with indications that it would be a remake of a successful Kannada film. The film continued shooting through early 2008, when the film was renamed as Aval Ullathai following protests from the people of Etayapuram, where the historical figure Ettappan lived in the 18th century. By June 2008, reports indicated that the film was nearing completion, and a release would be likely soon after that date.

However, following that announcement the film failed to find distributors and remained inactive for eighteen months until release.

Release

Reception
The film, released amidst two years of delays, on 12 February 2010 coinciding with the Valentine's Day weekend. The film opened in only a few centres across Chennai, Tamil Nadu to a below average opening. The film which grossed Rs. 2,22,608 in the opening weekend, failed commercially at the box-office.

Reviews
Upon release the film fetched predominantly negative reviews with Rediff.com claiming that the film "lacks substance" with "pot-holes the size of craters, uninspired acting and dull music", the film falls "after the first half-hour". In regard to the performances, the review claims that Navya Nair and Arvind Akash try "valiantly to act despite clichéd dialogues, weird situations and commercial twists" whilst Srikanth tries "very hard, but looks constipated". The review also criticizes the director claiming that the script had "potential" but "every intriguing plot-twist turns into a damp squib".

Soundtrack

The soundtrack was well received by the audience. However, due to the late release of the movie as well as the bad box office performance, music was compromised. 
Film score and the soundtrack are composed by Vijay Antony. The film falso featured a remiz from a yesteryear film, the title track.

References

External links
 

2010 films
Films shot in Ooty
2010s Tamil-language films